Vito Fassano (born 11 February 1940) is a Venezuelan former footballer. He played in five matches for the Venezuela national football team from 1967 to 1969. He was also part of Venezuela's squad for the 1967 South American Championship.

References

External links
 

1940 births
Living people
Venezuelan footballers
Venezuela international footballers
Footballers from Bari
Association football goalkeepers
Deportivo Italia players
Cruzeiro Esporte Clube players
Venezuelan expatriate footballers
Expatriate footballers in Brazil